The Ridenhour Prizes are awards in four categories given annually in recognition of those "who persevere in acts of truth-telling that protect the public interest, promote social justice or illuminate a more just vision of society".

History
The awards are presented by The Nation Institute and The Fertel Foundation in recognition of Ron Ridenhour, the Vietnam War veteran who exposed the My Lai Massacre. Each prize carries a $10,000 stipend. The prizes were first awarded in 2004.

Prize categories
 The Ridenhour Courage Prize
 The Ridenhour Book Prize
 The Ridenhour Truth-Telling Prize
 The Ridenhour Documentary Film Prize (since 2011)

Past winners

The Ridenhour Courage Prize 
 2004: Daniel Ellsberg
 2005: Seymour Hersh
 2006: Gloria Steinem
 2007: Jimmy Carter
 2008: Bill Moyers
 2009: Bob Herbert
 2010: Howard Zinn (posthumous)
 2011: Russ Feingold
 2012: John Lewis
 2013: James Hansen
 2014: Frederick A.O. Schwarz, Jr.
 2015: James Risen
 2016: Jamie Kalven
 2017: Anna Deavere Smith
 2018: Tarana Burke
 2019: George Soros (donated all of prize money to Hungarian Spectrum)
 2020: Denis Hayes
 2021: José Andrés
 2022: Anita Hill

The Ridenhour Book Prize 
 2004: Deborah Scroggins, for Emma's War: An Aid Worker, Radical Islam, and the Politics of Oil – A True Story of Love and Death in the Sudan
 2005: Adrian Nicole LeBlanc, for Random Family: Love, Drugs, Trouble, and Coming of Age in the Bronx
 2006: Anthony Shadid, for Night Draws Near: Iraq's People in the Shadow of America's War
 2007: Rajiv Chandrasekaran, for Imperial Life in the Emerald City: Inside Iraq's Green Zone,
 2008: James Scurlock, for Maxed Out: Hard Times in the Age of Easy Credit
 2009: Jane Mayer, for The Dark Side: The Inside Story of How the War on Terror Turned Into A War on American Ideals
 2010: Joe Sacco, for Footnotes in Gaza
 2011: Wendell Potter, for Deadly Spin: An Insurance Company Insider Speaks Out on How Corporate PR is Killing Healthcare and Deceiving Americans
 2012: Ali H. Soufan, for The Black Banners: The Inside Story of 9/11 and the War Against al‐Qaeda
 2013: Seth Rosenfeld, for Subversives: The FBI's War on Student Radicals, and Reagan's Rise to Power
 2014: Sheri Fink, for Five Days at Memorial: Life and Death in a Storm-Ravaged Hospital
 2015: Anand Gopal, for No Good Men Among the Living: America, the Taliban, and the War Through Afghan Eyes
 2016: Jill Leovy, for Ghettoside: A True Story of Murder in America
 2017: Heather Ann Thompson, for Blood in the Water: The Attica Prison Uprising of 1971 and Its Legacy
 2018: Lauren Markham, for The Far Away Brothers: Two Young Migrants and the Making of an American Life
 2019: Eliza Griswold, for Amity and Prosperity: One Family and the Fracturing of America
 2020: Chanel Miller for Know My Name: A Memoir
 2021: Claudio Saunt for Unworthy Republic: The dispossession of Native Americans and the road to Indian Territory

The Ridenhour Truth-Telling Prize 
 2004: Joseph Wilson
 2005: Kristen Breitweiser
 2006: Rick S. Piltz
 2007: Donald Vance
 2008: Matthew Diaz
 2009: Thomas Tamm
 2010: Matthew Hoh
 2011: Thomas Andrews Drake
 2012: Eileen Foster and Daniel Davis
 2013: Jose Antonio Vargas
 2014: Edward Snowden and Laura Poitras
 2015: Aicha Elbasri
 2016: Mona Hanna-Attisha
 2017: Daniela Vargas
 2018: Carmen Yulín Cruz Soto
 2019: Dr. Scott Allen, Dr. Pamela McPherson, and Scott Shuchart
 2020: Dr. Rick A. Bright
 2021: Cariol Horne

The Ridenhour Documentary Film Prize 
 2011: Julia Bacha, Ronit Avni and Rula Salameh, for Budrus
 2012: Rachel Libert and Tony Hardmon, for Semper Fi: Always Faithful
 2013: Kirby Dick and Amy Ziering, for The Invisible War
 2014: Dawn Porter, for Gideon's Army
 2015: Laura Poitras, for Citizenfour
 2016: Joshua Oppenheimer, for The Look of Silence
 2017: Sonia Kennebeck, for National Bird
 2018: Joe Piscatella, for Joshua: Teenager vs. Superpower
 2019: Alexandria Bombach, for On Her Shoulders
 2020: Nanfu Wang and Jialing Zhang, for One Child Nation
 2021: Ramona Diaz, for A Thousand Cuts
 2022: Stanley Nelson Jr. and Traci A. Curry, for Attica

Special Ridenhour Prize for Reportorial Distinction 
 2009: Nick Turse

References

External links 
 The Ridenhour Prizes official site
 Fertel Foundation site with links to sites related to Ridenhour and My Lai

Humanitarian and service awards
Awards established in 2004
Whistleblowing
American non-fiction literary awards
American documentary film awards
2004 establishments in the United States
Awards established in 2011
2011 establishments in the United States